John Alan Lee (August 24, 1933 – December 5, 2013) was a Canadian writer, academic and political activist, best known as an early advocate for LGBT rights in Canada, for his academic research into sociological and psychological aspects of love and sexuality, and for his later-life advocacy of assisted suicide and the right to die.

Early life
Born in Maxville, Ontario in 1933, he grew up as a ward of the provincial Children's Aid Society after his father abandoned the family and his mother was financially and emotionally unable to care for Lee and his brother David on her own as a single mother.

He was a factory worker and trade unionist in his youth, and ran as a Cooperative Commonwealth Federation candidate in the electoral district of Broadview in the 1958 election.

Education and academic career
He completed an undergraduate degree in sociology at the University of Toronto in 1956, and earned a Ph.D. from the University of Sussex in 1971. He then joined the University of Toronto as a faculty member in 1971. In the same year, his book Test Pattern: Instructional Television at Scarborough College, University of Toronto was published by the University of Toronto Press, a report on instructional television as medium at the University of Toronto Scarborough. Teaching at the university until his retirement in 1999, he was the author of over 300 books and articles in sociology, predominantly focusing on sociological study of the LGBT community and on the broader psychology of love and sexuality.

His articles appeared in publications including the Canadian Journal of Higher Education, the Journal of Homosexuality, Psychology Today, The Body Politic, Canadian Forum and Christopher Street. His most noted books were The Colours of Love (1973), the first prominent work of research into the concept of love styles, and Getting Sex (1978), a study of gay sexual cruising.

Activism
In 1964, Lee began working as an "undercover gay activist", writing letters to various publications to protest unfair and biased depictions of LGBT people and writing more balanced pieces of his own. Initially undertaking this work anonymously or under pseudonyms, in 1974 he officially came out on TVOntario's The Judy LaMarsh Show, becoming one of Canada's first professional figures ever to come out as gay.

In 1975, he was one of the founders of the University of Toronto's Gay Academic Union. In 1979, he was an organizer of an LGBT rights protest which consisted of a three-day sit-in in the offices of provincial Attorney General Roy McMurtry. Following Operation Soap in 1981, he was one of the founders of the Right to Privacy Committee.

He was also active in other organizations, including the Sierra Club, Amnesty International and the Religious Society of Friends.

Late in life he was active in Dying with Dignity, a Canadian right to die activist group. Although in poor health he was not terminally ill, but advocated that he should have the right to die on the grounds that his life was complete and he no longer had anything new he wanted to accomplish or achieve. During this era, he also published his autobiography, Love's Gay Fool, as a free document on his own website.

He ended his life on December 5, 2013.

Honours
In honour of his role as a significant builder of LGBT culture and history in Canada, a portrait of Lee, by artist Norman Hatton, is held by The ArQuives: Canada's LGBTQ2+ Archives' National Portrait Collection. The archives also now hold many of his personal papers and records from throughout his career.

References

External links
John Alan Lee (archived)
 ''John Alan Lee fonds at The ArQuives: Canada's LGBTQ2+ Archives''

1933 births
2013 deaths
University of Toronto alumni
Alumni of the University of Sussex
Canadian sociologists
Canadian Quakers
Canadian trade unionists
Canadian LGBT politicians
Canadian LGBT rights activists
Canadian gay writers
Academic staff of the University of Toronto
Ontario candidates for Member of Parliament
Writers from Toronto
People from the United Counties of Stormont, Dundas and Glengarry
Canadian autobiographers
Co-operative Commonwealth Federation candidates for the Canadian House of Commons